Donald J. Hanaway (December 25, 1933 – September 7, 1995) was the 40th Attorney General of the State of Wisconsin, serving from 1987 to 1991. He defeated incumbent Democrat Bronson La Follette in 1986, but was himself defeated for re-election by Democrat Jim Doyle in 1990.

Biography

Hanaway was born in Stevens Point, Wisconsin. He graduated from the University of Wisconsin–Madison School of Commerce in 1958, and received his juris doctor from the University of Wisconsin Law School in 1961. He had previously served in the United States Army from 1954 to 1956.

Before being elected Attorney General, Hanaway served as a Brown County Assistant District Attorney from 1962 to 1964, and later as a special prosecutor in Brown County from 1967 to 1968. He also served concurrently as the De Pere city attorney from 1965 to 1972, and again from 1976 to 1979. In between those stints as city attorney, he served as mayor of De Pere from 1972 to 1974.

Hanaway was elected as a Republican in a special election to the Wisconsin State Senate in July 1979. He was re-elected to the State Senate's 2nd District in 1980, and again in 1984. He served as an assistant minority leader from 1981 to 1982.

In 1986, Hanaway ran for attorney general, defeating incumbent Bronson La Follette. He served one term, being defeated for re-election by Jim Doyle in 1990.

Hanaway went on to serve as a Brown County Circuit Judge from 1991 until his death in 1995. Hanaway died from cancer at a hospital in Green Bay, Wisconsin. He and his wife, Jo Ann, had four children.

Electoral history
1990 Race for state Attorney General
Jim Doyle (D), 51%
Don Hanaway (R) (inc.), 47%

Notes

1933 births
1995 deaths
People from Stevens Point, Wisconsin
Politicians from Green Bay, Wisconsin
Military personnel from Wisconsin
Republican Party Wisconsin state senators
District attorneys in Wisconsin
Mayors of places in Wisconsin
Wisconsin Attorneys General
Wisconsin state court judges
Wisconsin School of Business alumni
University of Wisconsin Law School alumni
20th-century American lawyers
20th-century American judges
People from De Pere, Wisconsin
Deaths from cancer in Wisconsin
20th-century American politicians